Badraq-e Molla (also Romanized as Badrāq-e Mollā) is a village in Sheykh Musa Rural District, in the Central District of Aqqala County, Golestan Province, Iran. At the 2006 census, its population was 1,020, in 199 families.

References 

Populated places in Aqqala County